Doto chica is a species of sea slug, a nudibranch, a marine gastropod mollusc in the family Dotidae.

Distribution
Distribution of Doto chica includes Florida, Mexico, Costa Rica, Venezuela, Puerto Rico, Curaçao, Cuba, Brazil and Panama.

Description 
The body is narrow and elongate. Rhinophores are smooth and rhinophoral sheaths are with small posterior extensions. Cerata are large, with rounded tubercles; apical tubercles much larger than the rest. Background color is translucent gray with a dense series of dark brown spots and a less dense set of opaque white spots on the dorsum. Cerata are with orange extensions of the digestive gland. The maximum recorded body length is 5 mm or up to 10 mm.

Ecology 
Minimum recorded depth is 4 m. Maximum recorded depth is 4 m.

It can be found on hydroids. It is known to feed on hydroids of the genus Eudendrium.

References
This article incorporates Creative Commons (CC-BY-4.0) text from the reference

External links

Dotidae
Gastropods described in 1960
Taxa named by Eveline Du Bois-Reymond Marcus
Taxa named by Ernst Marcus (zoologist)